Neil Gibson (1899 – 1974) was a Scottish footballer who played as a centre half, primarily for Clyde. He scored the goal which won the Glasgow Cup for the club in the 1925–26 season, with a win over Celtic at their own ground, and in 1929 was selected to play for the Glasgow FA select team in their annual match against the Sheffield FA.

His father Neilly Gibson and younger brother Jimmy both played for the Scotland national team and at club level with teams including Partick Thistle (where Neil had a short spell as a young player), while elder brother Willie also played professionally with Newcastle United.

References

Date of birth uncertain
1899 births
1974 deaths
Footballers from South Lanarkshire
Sportspeople from Larkhall
Association football defenders
Scottish footballers
Queen of the South F.C. players
Ashfield F.C. players
Royal Albert F.C. players
Partick Thistle F.C. players
Clyde F.C. players
Scottish Football League players
Scottish Junior Football Association players